Unione Sportiva Pergolese is an Italian association football club located in Pergola, Marche. It currently plays in the Eccellenza. Its colors are red and blue.

References

External links
Official site

Pergolese
Association football clubs established in 1923
Pergolese
1923 establishments in Italy